Zou Zhe ( 1636-ca. 1708), was a Chinese painter during the Qing Dynasty.

Zou was born in Wuxi in Jiangsu province. His courtesy name was Fanglu (方鲁）. He lived in Nanjing, and later became known as one of the Eight Masters of Nanjing. Zou specialized in landscapes and bird-and-flower paintings though only his landscape paintings still exist.

Notes

References
 Barnhart, R. M. et al. (1997). Three thousand years of Chinese painting. New Haven, Yale University Press. 

Painters from Wuxi
Qing dynasty landscape painters
1636 births
1708 deaths